Bang O station, is an elevated railway station on MRT Blue Line. The station opened on 4 December 2019. The station is one of the nine stations of phase 3 of MRT Blue Line.

References 

MRT (Bangkok) stations